Wiebo's War is a 2011 Canadian documentary about eco-warrior Wiebo Ludwig, directed by David York.

Ludwig was first approached by York in 2008. Filming began in late 2008 and continued into 2010, with York living as a guest in the isolated Ludwig family compound in the community of Trickle Creek, approximately 450 kilometres northwest of Edmonton, Alberta. The film documents a stillbirth and a string of miscarriages among Ludwig family members, as well as livestock deaths, which Ludwigs attribute to sour gas from nearby gas wells. In one scene, Ludwig home video shows Wiebo holding the stillborn infant, while in another, a family member ignites water from the kitchen tap. During filming in early 2010, Ludwig was arrested as a suspect in bombings of sour-gas installations in nearby British Columbia. The film also explores Ludwig's religious views, with excerpts from a four-hour conversation between the atheist film director and Wiebo and his sons, who tell York that he is living in a "terrible darkness."

Release
Wiebo's War had its world premiere at the Thessaloniki Documentary Festival and its North American premiere at the 2011 Hot Docs Canadian International Documentary Festival. The film opened theatrically in Canada on October 14, 2011 in Ottawa, Ontario.

Credits
Wiebo's War is produced by David York, Bryn Hughes and Nick Hector for 52 Media and Bonnie Thompson for the National Film Board of Canada (NFB). The executive producers are David Christensen (NFB) and David York (52 Media).

References

External links
Film website, 52 Media 
Film website, National Film Board of Canada

2011 films
2011 documentary films
National Film Board of Canada documentaries
Films shot in Alberta
Documentary films about fossil fuels
Documentary films about terrorism
Documentary films about Christianity
Eco-terrorism
Documentary films about families
2010s English-language films
2010s Canadian films